May Sinclair was the pseudonym of Mary Amelia St. Clair (24 August 1863 – 14 November 1946), a popular British writer who wrote about two dozen novels, short stories and poetry. She was an active suffragist, and member of the Woman Writers' Suffrage League. She once dressed up as a demure, rebel Jane Austen for a suffrage fundraising event. Sinclair was also a significant critic in the area of modernist poetry and prose, and she is attributed with first using the term 'stream of consciousness' in a literary context, when reviewing the first volumes of Dorothy Richardson's novel sequence Pilgrimage (1915–1967), in The Egoist, April 1918.

Early life

Sinclair was born in Rock Ferry, Cheshire. Her mother, Amelia Sinclair, was strict and religious; her father, William Sinclair, was a Liverpool shipowner, who went bankrupt, became an alcoholic, and died when Sinclair was still a child. The family moved to Ilford on the edge of London. After one year of education at Cheltenham Ladies College, Sinclair was obliged to look after her brothers, as four of the five, all older than she, were suffering from fatal congenital heart disease.

Career
From 1896 Sinclair wrote professionally to support herself and her mother, who died in 1901. An active feminist, Sinclair treated a number of themes relating to the position of women and marriage. Her works sold well in the United States.

Sinclair's suffrage activities were remembered by Sylvia Pankhurst. Photographs (as "Mary Sinlair" show her around the WSPU offices in Kensington. In 1912 the Women Writers' Suffrage League published her ideas on feminism. Here she de-bunked theories put forward by Sir Almroth Wright that the suffragists were powered by their sexual frustration because of the shortage of men. She said that suffrage and the class struggle were similar aspirations and the working woman should not be in competition with the ambitions of the male working class.

Around 1913, she was a founding supporter of the Medico-Psychological Clinic in London which was run by Dr Jessie Murray. Sinclair became interested in psychoanalytic thought, and introduced matter related to Sigmund Freud's teaching in her novels. In 1914, she volunteered to join the Munro Ambulance Corps, a charitable organization (which included Lady Dorothie Feilding, Elsie Knocker and Mairi Chisholm) that aided wounded Belgian soldiers on the Western Front in Flanders. She was sent home after only a few weeks at the front; she wrote about the experience in both prose and poetry. 

Her 1913 novel The Combined Maze, the story of a London clerk and the two women he loves, was highly praised by critics, including George Orwell, while Agatha Christie considered it one of the greatest English novels of its time.

She wrote early criticism on Imagism and the poet H. D. (1915 in The Egoist); she was on social terms with H. D. (Hilda Doolittle), Richard Aldington and Ezra Pound at the time. She also reviewed in a positive light the poetry of T. S. Eliot (1917 in the Little Review) and the fiction of Dorothy Richardson (1918 in The Egoist). 
Some aspects of Sinclair's subsequent novels have been traced as influenced by modernist techniques, particularly in the autobiographical Mary Olivier: A Life (1919). She was included in the 1925 Contact Collection of Contemporary Writers.

Sinclair wrote two volumes of supernatural fiction, Uncanny Stories (1923) and The Intercessor and Other Stories (1931). E. F. Bleiler called Sinclair "an underrated writer" and described Uncanny Stories as "excellent". Gary Crawford has stated Sinclair's contribution to the supernatural fiction genre, "small as it is, is notable". Jacques Barzun included Sinclair among a list of supernatural fiction writers that "one should make a point of seeking out". Brian Stableford has stated that  Sinclair's "supernatural tales are written with uncommon delicacy and precision, and they are among the most effective examples of their fugitive kind". Andrew Smith has described Uncanny Stories as "an important contribution to the ghost story".
 
From the late 1920s, she was suffering from the early signs of Parkinson's disease, and ceased writing. She settled with a companion in Buckinghamshire in 1932.

She is buried at St John-at-Hampstead's churchyard, London.

Philosophy

Sinclair also wrote non-fiction based on studies of philosophy, particularly idealism. She defended a form of idealistic monism in her book A Defence of Idealism (1917).

Sinclair was interested in parapsychology and spiritualism, she was a member of the Society for Psychical Research from 1914.

Works

Nakiketas and other poems (1886) as Julian Sinclair
Essays in Verse (1892)
Audrey Craven (1897)
Mr and Mrs Nevill Tyson (1898) also The Tysons
Two Sides Of A Question (1901)
The Divine Fire (1904)
The Helpmate (1907)
The Judgment of Eve (1907) stories
The Immortal Moment (1908)
Kitty Tailleur (1908)
Outlines of Church History by Rudolph Sohm (1909) translator
The Creators (1910)
Miss Tarrant's Temperament (1911) in Harper's Magazine
The Flaw in the Crystal (1912)
The Three Brontes (1912)
Feminism (1912) pamphlet for Women's Suffrage League
The Combined Maze (1913)
The Three Sisters (1914)
The Return of the Prodigal (1914)
A Journal of Impressions in Belgium (1915)
The Belfry (1916)
Tasker Jevons: The Real Story (1916)
The Tree of Heaven (1917)
A Defence of Idealism: Some Questions & Conclusions (1917)
Mary Olivier: A Life (1919)
The Romantic (1920)
Mr. Waddington of Wyck (1921)
Life and Death of Harriett Frean (1922)
Anne Severn and the Fieldings (1922)
The New Idealism (1922)
Uncanny Stories (1923)
A Cure of Souls (1924)
The Dark Night: A Novel in Unrhymed Verse (1924)
Arnold Waterlow (1924)
The Rector of Wyck (1925)
Far End (1926)
The Allinghams (1927)
History of Anthony Waring (1927)
Fame (1929)
Tales Told by Simpson (1930) stories
The Intercessor, and Other Stories (1931)
Villa Désirée (1932)

References

Sources

Theophilus Ernest Martin Boll (1973) Miss May Sinclair: Novelist; A Biographical and Critical Introduction
Suzanne Raitt (2000) May Sinclair: A Modern Victorian
George M. Johnson (2006) "May Sinclair: The Evolution of a Psychological Novelist" in Dynamic Psychology in Modern British Fiction. Palgrave Macmillan, 2006. pp. 101–143.

External links

May Sinclair Society
An essay on May Sinclair, Dorothy Richardson, and 'Stream of Consciousness'
A 2001 essay by Leigh Wilson (University of Westminster), from The Literary Encyclopedia
 
 
 
 
 
 
The Cellar-House of Pervyse (1917) at Internet Archive
We Brought Succour to Belgium (1914) at 'A Nurse at the War'
May Sinclair and the First World War (Part 1) (1999) at National Humanities Center
May Sinclair and the First World War (Part 2) (1999) at National Humanities Center
May Sinclair papers Kislak Center for Special Collections, Rare Books and Manuscripts, University of Pennsylvania

1863 births
1946 deaths
British women in World War I
British women short story writers
English short story writers
English feminists
English spiritualists
English women poets
Idealists
Ghost story writers
Modernist women writers
Parapsychologists
People from Birkenhead